Pratyush Singh (born 4 September 1994) is an Indian first-class cricketer who plays for Bihar in domestic cricket. He is a right-arm leg-break bowler. He was a member of the Chennai Super Kings squad in 2015. He made his first-class debut for Jharkhand in the 2016–17 Ranji Trophy on 20 October 2016. He made his List A debut for Jharkhand in the 2016–17 Vijay Hazare Trophy on 15 March 2017.

In December 2018, while batting for Tripura against Goa in the 2018–19 Ranji Trophy, he scored his maiden century in first-class debut. He was the leading run-scorer for Tripura in the tournament, with 464 runs in eight matches.

References

External links
Pratyush Singh - ESPN Cricinfo

Living people
1994 births
Indian cricketers
Delhi cricketers
Chennai Super Kings cricketers
Delhi Capitals cricketers
Jharkhand cricketers
Tripura cricketers
Cricketers from Bihar